Kam Air is the largest private Afghan airline. Founded in 2003, Kam Air has twelve aircraft and a workforce of over 1,200 people, operating scheduled domestic passenger services throughout Afghanistan and international services to destinations in Central Asia, South Asia, and the Middle East. Its hub is at Kabul International Airport in the capital Kabul.

History
Kam Air was the first private commercial airline established in Afghanistan by the owner and founder of Kamgar Group, Zamarai Kamgar, an Afghan businessman. Kam Air's Operator Certificate (AOC Nr. 001) was issued in August 2003 by the Ministry of Transport and Civil Aviation (MoTCA) of Afghanistan. Kam Air was registered with International Civil Aviation Organization (ICAO) three letter airline code, KMF, International Air Transport Association (IATA) two letter code, RQ and financial code 384.

The first flight of Kam Air was operated from Kabul to Herat and Mazar-i-Sharif in November 2003 with a Boeing 727-200, while the first international flight was inaugurated in May 2004 between Kabul and Dubai.

On 25 January 2013, the United States blacklisted Kam Air citing a United States Army investigation that the airline smuggled opium on civilian flights to Tajikistan, an allegation denied by the airline and the Afghan government. The ban was suspended a month later.

On 24 February 2021, Kam Air operated Afghanistan's first ever all-female crew flight. The airline's former first and last commercial female Afghan pilot, then 22-year-old Mohadese Mirzaee, joined now former Captain Veronica Borysova from Ukraine in piloting the Boeing 737-500 from Hamid Karzai International Airport in Kabul to Herat. Aside from Veronica the female crew was entirely made up of women from the Hazara ethnic group. The event made global headlines and was first covered by Josh Cahill who documented the flight, and later featured on BBC News, Deutsche Welle and the Business Insider. The flight took 90 minutes.

Due to the collapse of the Islamic Republic of Afghanistan, all civilian services in the country were temporarily suspended on 15 August 2021. Kam Air flew some of its planes to Iran to prevent damage during the turmoil. However, domestic flights restarted on 5 September 2021. International flights were also later resumed.

Frequent Flyer Program 
Kam Air's frequent flyer program includes a loyalty membership called the Orange Miles.

Destinations

As of September 2019, Kam Air flew to a total of 16 destinations: seven domestic destinations and nine international, in eight countries. The airline had an extensive domestic network, flying  to Herat, Zaranj, Kandahar, Trinkot, Mazar-e-sharif, and Faizabad. Internationally, Kam Air flew to Istanbul, Ankara, Riyadh, Jeddah, Kuwait, Tashkent, Dushanbe, Islamabad and New Delhi.

Codeshare agreements
Kam Air has codeshares with the following airlines:
 Air Arabia

Interline partners 
 Air India
 Flynas
 Malaysia Airlines
 Saudia
 Turkish Airlines
 Vistara

Fleet

Current fleet
As of September 2022, Kam Air has the following aircraft in its fleet:

In August 2021, Kam Air sent an unspecified number of its aircraft to Iran for temporary storage amidst safety concerns following the fall of Kabul and the resulting chaos that surrounded the city's airport.

Former fleet
The airline previously operated the following aircraft:
2 ATR 42
2 Airbus A320-200
6 Boeing 737-200
1 Boeing 737-400
2 Boeing 737-500
3 Boeing 737-800 leased from AirExplore and Pegasus Airlines
2 Boeing 767-200
1 Boeing 767-300 leased from Ukrainian Wings
4 Fokker 100 leased from Bek Air
2 McDonnell Douglas MD-82
5 McDonnell Douglas MD-83 (three leased from Bravo Airways)
2 Saab 340 leased from Air Urga

Accidents and incidents
 On 3 February 2005, Kam Air Flight 904, a Boeing 737-200 operated by Phoenix Aviation, flying from Herat International Airport in western Afghanistan, vanished from radar screens on approach to Kabul International Airport in poor weather. The disappearance sparked a massive Afghan army search operation for the 96 passengers and 8 crew. The wreckage of the plane was found on 5 February 2005 in the mountains east of Kabul. All 104 people aboard were killed.
On 11 August 2010, Douglas DC-8-63F YA-VIC suffered a tailstrike on take-off from Manston Airport, United Kingdom, destroying an approach light. The aircraft was operating an international cargo flight to Buenos Aires, Argentina, via the Cape Verde Islands. The incident was caused by the aircraft being  overweight due to excess fuel load and misestimating of cargo mass.  After being informed of the mishap, the crew continued to Cape Verde. An inspection there confirmed the tailstrike, though analysis of the strike indicator showed the plane was still safe. The incident was investigated by the Air Accidents Investigation Branch, which made various safety recommendations. Kam Air was subsequently banned from operating within the European Union. The three crew involved were also dismissed, and Kam Air announced that it would withdraw its two DC-8s from service.
In January 2018, Kam Air reported that nine staff members were killed in a Taliban attack on a hotel in Kabul – seven Ukrainian employees and two Kam air employees from Venezuela. Kam Air had rented 50 rooms for their foreign staff at the hotel, described as one of Kabul's "most heavily guarded." Five were pilots, and four were crew members. Afterwards, over 50 of the airline's foreign workers left the country, and by 26 January, five of its nine aircraft sat idle due to lack of staffing. A large number of daily flights were also being canceled for that reason.

References

External links

Airlines banned in the European Union
Airlines of Afghanistan
Airlines established in 2003
2003 establishments in Afghanistan